Tatum Beatrice O'Neal (born November 5, 1963) is an American actress. She is the youngest person ever to win an Academy Award, winning at age 10 for her performance as Addie Loggins in Paper Moon (1973) opposite her father, Ryan O'Neal. She also starred as Amanda Wurlitzer in The Bad News Bears (1976), followed by Nickelodeon (1976), and Little Darlings (1980). O'Neal later appeared in guest roles in Sex and the City, 8 Simple Rules and Law & Order: Criminal Intent. From 2006 to 2007, she portrayed Blythe Hunter in the My Network TV drama series Wicked Wicked Games.

Family background 
O'Neal was born in the Westwood area of Los Angeles, California, to actors Ryan O'Neal and Joanna Moore. Her brother, Griffin, was born in 1964. In 1967, her parents divorced and her father quickly married actress Leigh Taylor-Young, together having Tatum's half-brother, Patrick. The two divorced in 1973. Tatum has another half-brother, Redmond, from Ryan O'Neal's relationship with actress Farrah Fawcett. O'Neal's mother died of lung cancer at age 63, after a career in which she appeared in such movies as Walk on the Wild Side and Follow That Dream. Her paternal ancestry is Irish, English, and Ashkenazi Jewish.

Career

Young career 

On April 2, 1974, at age ten, Tatum O'Neal won the Academy Award for Best Supporting Actress and the Golden Globe Award for New Star Of The Year – Actress for her performance in Paper Moon, released in May 1973. The youngest ever to win a competitive Academy Award, she turned nine years old during filming in autumn 1972. O'Neal played the role of Addie Loggins, a child con artist being tutored by a Depression-era grifter played by her father. In her 2010 appearance on RuPaul's Drag Race, O'Neal stated that her father had not attended the Academy Awards ceremony with her due to his busy schedule.

O'Neal starred in films such as The Bad News Bears (1976) with Walter Matthau, International Velvet (1978) with Christopher Plummer and Anthony Hopkins, and Little Darlings (1980) with Kristy McNichol, and co-starred in Nickelodeon (1976) with her father, and in Circle of Two (1980) with Richard Burton. She appeared as the title character in the Faerie Tale Theatre episode "Goldilocks and the Three Bears" (1984).

Later career 
O'Neal appeared in only five films during the next 15 years, one of them being Basquiat (1996) as Cynthia Kruger.

In the early 2000s, O'Neal returned to acting with guest appearances in Sex and the City, 8 Simple Rules for Dating My Teenage Daughter, and Law & Order: Criminal Intent. In 2005, O'Neal began a recurring role as Maggie Gavin in the firehouse drama series Rescue Me, portraying the unbalanced and lively sister of Tommy Gavin, played by Denis Leary.

In January 2006, she participated in the second season of ABC's reality series Dancing with the Stars with professional partner Nick Kosovich. They were eliminated in the second round. She went on to do commentary for the series on Entertainment Tonight.

From 2006 to 2007, she portrayed the vindictive and psychotic Blythe Hunter in the MyNetworkTV drama Wicked Wicked Games. She appears opposite Nashawn Kearse and Vanessa Williams in the film My Brother (2007).

In 2008, she appeared in the Lifetime original film Fab Five: The Texas Cheerleader Scandal. The film is based on a true story which took place at McKinney North High School in Texas. She portrayed the mother of the main character, Brooke Tippit, and became close friends with the character's actress, Ashley Benson, whom she mentored in acting.

In 2021, O'Neal appeared in the film Not To Forget (2021), which aimed to raise awareness and funds for the fight against Alzheimer's. The movie, directed by Valerio Zanoli, stars Karen Grassle and five Academy Award winners: O'Neal, Cloris Leachman, Louis Gossett Jr., George Chakiris, and Olympia Dukakis.

Personal life

Family and romantic relationships 
One of O'Neal's first public boyfriends was celebrity Michael Jackson, whom she dated in the late 1970s. Jackson described O'Neal as his first love, and in a 2002 interview with Martin Bashir said that O'Neal tried to seduce him, but he was terrified by the idea of sex. O'Neal adamantly denied all of Jackson's claims in her 2004 autobiography.

O'Neal's relationship with tennis player John McEnroe began in 1984 when she moved into his Central Park West apartment in New York City. They married in 1986. The couple have three children: Kevin, Sean and Emily. They separated in  1992 and were divorced in 1994. Following the divorce, O'Neal's drug problems reemerged and she developed an addiction to heroin. As a result, McEnroe obtained custody of the children in 1998.

In 2011, Tatum and her father began to restore their relationship after 25 years. Their reunion and reconciliation process was captured in the short-lived Oprah Winfrey Network series Ryan and Tatum: The O'Neals. In 2015, she said she had begun dating women, while choosing not to identify herself as homosexual, bisexual or heterosexual, saying, "I'm not one or the other."

Arrest 
On June 1, 2008, O'Neal was arrested for buying crack cocaine near her Manhattan apartment building. When police searched her, they allegedly found two bags of drugs—one of crack cocaine, one of powder cocaine—and an unused crack pipe. She was charged with a misdemeanor criminal possession of a controlled substance. Authorities released her without bail. On July 2, 2008, O'Neal pleaded guilty to disorderly conduct in connection with the arrest and agreed to spend two half-day sessions in a drug treatment program.

Autobiographies 
In her 2004 autobiography, A Paper Life, O'Neal alleged that she was molested by her father's drug dealer when she was 12. She also alleges physical and emotional abuse by her father, much of which she attributed to drug use. She also detailed her heroin addiction and its effects on her relationship with her children. Her father denied the allegations. In a prepared statement, Ryan O'Neal said: "It is a sad day when malicious lies are told in order to become a 'bestseller.

In 2011, O'Neal wrote a new collection of memoirs, Found: A Daughter's Journey Home, which dealt with her tempestuous relationship with her father, volatile marriage to McEnroe, and recent drug arrest.

Published works
 A Paper Life. .
 Found: A Daughter's Journey Home.

Filmography

Film

Television

See also 
 List of oldest and youngest Academy Award winners and nominees

References

External links 

 
 
 When Young Stars Burn Out MSN Movies (archived 2010)
 O'Neal accepting Academy Award at age 10 – April 2, 1974—YouTube
 Portrait of Tatum O'Neal, holding her Oscar for "Paper Moon" at the 47th Annual Academy Awards, California, 1974. Los Angeles Times Photographic Archive (Collection 1429). UCLA Library Special Collections, Charles E. Young Research Library, University of California, Los Angeles.

20th-century American actresses
21st-century American actresses
Actresses from Los Angeles
American child actresses
American film actresses
American people of English descent
American people of Irish descent
American people of Jewish descent
American television actresses
Best Supporting Actress Academy Award winners
Living people
LGBT actresses
LGBT memoirists
LGBT people from California
American LGBT actors
New Star of the Year (Actress) Golden Globe winners
David di Donatello winners
American women memoirists
American memoirists
1963 births